The Ronde de l'Oise is a cycling stage race held annually in the department of Oise in France. It was founded in 1954 and in 2007 became part of the UCI Europe Tour in category 2.2.

Winners
Sources:

References

External links
  

UCI Europe Tour races
Cycle races in France
Recurring sporting events established in 1954
1954 establishments in France